The Edmonton Cup is a one game association football tournament which takes place in Edmonton, Alberta, Canada.

The first game took place on 25 July 2009 between the Argentine club River Plate and the English club Everton at Commonwealth Stadium in  Edmonton, Alberta, Canada, to celebrate the 100th anniversary of Alberta Soccer Association. The latest match took place on 21 July 2010 between FC Edmonton and the English club Portsmouth and was played at the Commonwealth Stadium.

Match

References

External links
Official site

Soccer in Edmonton
Soccer in Alberta
Canadian soccer friendly trophies